State Road 742 (SR 742) is a east–west state highway serving Pensacola, Florida. It is both a commuter road and a bypass route that also provides access (via Ninth Avenue/SR 289 and Airport Boulevard/SR 750) for motorists to Pensacola International Airport.  Locally known as Burgess Road and Creighton Boulevard, SR 742 stays within a mile south of Interstate 10 (I-10 or SR 8) from the state road's western terminus at U.S. Route 29 (US 29 or SR 95) near Ensley to SR 742's eastern terminus at US 90 in Pensacola.

SR 742 east of SR 289 was itself part of SR 289 until the mid-1970s.

Major intersections

References

External links

AARoads Highway Guide page for Florida State Road 742. 

742
742